Adavi Ramudu is a 2004 Indian Telugu-language romantic action film which was directed by B. Gopal. Prabhas and Aarti Agarwal played the lead roles. The film features a love story between a tribal youth and his childhood sweetheart. This was Prabhas' next movie immediately after the success of Varsham. Upon release, it received mostly negative reception from the critics and audience alike and was a flop at the box-office. The film was later dubbed into Hindi as The Strong Man Badal in 2009.

Plot
In her childhood, Madhu befriends a boy in a village. Her uncle comes and insults the boy for being a tribal. Madhu then tells him to get an education so people will respect him more. 10 years later, the boy Ramu (Prabhas) returns to college, where he meets its most wanted woman Madhu (Aarti Agarwal), who falls in love with him. Later, she reveals in her birthday party that she was the childhood girl who told him to be an educated person. However, Madhu's mother, Tribhuvna (Telangana Shakuntala), insults him and throws him out of her party and house. Tribhuvna is a hot-minded woman who can do whatever she wants by using either mafia or politics. She wants to kill Ramu. What happens then is the rest of the movie.

Cast

 Prabhas as Ramu
 Aarti Agarwal as Madhu
 Brahmanandam as Puli Raja
 Ranganath as Madhu's father
 Telangana Shakuntala as Tribhuvna, Madhu's mother
 Sai Kumar
 Nassar as Peddayana, tribal leader
 Venu Madhav as Hanumanth
 Ajay Rathnam
 Rajeev Kanakala
 Ravi Babu
 Narsing Yadav
 Siva Reddy
 G. V. Sudhakar Naidu
 Bandla Ganesh
 Banerjee
 Seema
 Prabhakar
 Malladi Raghava
 Deepak Jethi 
 Ramya Krishna in item number

Soundtrack
The music was composed by Mani Sharma and released by Aditya Music. The song "Aresukoboye" was remixed from the 1977 film of the same name; S. P. Balasubrahmanyam reprises his role as the lead male singer.

Reception 
A critic from Sify wrote that "After seeing one feels that B.Gopal has to grow beyond his outdated formula films and bring out something refreshing".

References

External links 
 

2004 films
2000s Telugu-language films
Films directed by B. Gopal
Films scored by Mani Sharma
Indian romantic action films
2000s romantic action films